Madame X is the fourteenth studio album by American singer-songwriter Madonna. It was released on June 14, 2019, by Interscope Records. The album was creatively influenced by her expatriate life in Lisbon, Portugal, after relocating there in summer 2017. Madonna co-wrote and co-produced the album with a number of musicians, including Mirwais, Mike Dean, and Jason Evigan. It also features guest appearances by Maluma, Quavo, Swae Lee, and Anitta.

The album includes the singles "Medellín", "Crave", "I Rise" and "I Don't Search I Find". All four singles reached the top spot on the Dance Club Songs in the United States, extending her record as the artist with the most number-one songs on a singular Billboard chart, with a total of 50. It also featured two promotional singles: "Future" and "Dark Ballet".

Music critics gave generally positive reviews for the album, praising its experimental composition. Madame X debuted atop the Billboard 200 chart, becoming her ninth number-one album in the United States. It also topped the charts in Argentina as well as Portugal and reached number-two in Australia, Belgium, Canada, Italy, Mexico, the Netherlands, Switzerland, and the United Kingdom. The Madame X Tour, an all-theatre tour in North America and Europe, began on September 17, 2019, and concluded on March 8, 2020. The tour was chronicled in the documentary of the same name.

Background and development 

In January 2018, Madonna announced on Instagram that she had begun working on her fourteenth studio album. Four months later, in May 2018, she performed at the Met Gala in New York. As part of her performance of her hit single "Like a Prayer", Madonna sang a brand new song "Dark Ballet" (then known as "Beautiful Game"). In October 2018, she was featured on the song "Champagne Rosé" by rapper Quavo, who in return became her collaborator on this album.

Madonna relocated to Lisbon, Portugal in 2017, seeking a top football academy for boys for her son David, who wanted to become a professional soccer player. However, she later found her life becoming relatively dull, so she decided to meet artists, painters, and musicians. One of the first musicians Madonna met in Lisbon was a man named Dino D'Santiago, who she said introduced her to a great many more musicians in the area, including the Batukadeiras, a collective of drummers who she collaborated with on the track "Batuka" on this album.

Believing "music is the soul of the universe", she felt connected to her new influences, so she then decided to record an album based on her musical experience in the Portuguese city, which she believed to be "a melting pot of culture musically, from Angola to Guinea-Bissau to Spain to Brazil to France to Cape Verde".

During the period while the album was being worked on, Madonna posted short video clips and images chronicling her work on the album. French producer Mirwais Ahmadzaï, who has previously co-produced three of Madonna's albums, Music (2000), American Life (2003) and Confessions on a Dance Floor (2005), was confirmed to be one of the key producers for Madame X. Mike Dean, who co-produced Rebel Heart (2015), was also enlisted in the album's production. In February 2019, Maluma uploaded a picture on his Instagram account with Madonna in a studio. In her interview with Vogue Italia, Madonna divulged that her album was due for release in 2019. On April 14, 2019, she posted a series of teaser clips on her Instagram account, revealing Madame X as the album title.

Title, artwork, and themes 

In a one-minute teaser uploaded to Madonna's official Instagram and YouTube accounts, Madonna declares herself as "Madame X", an alter-ego her album is named after, a title shared by a 1908 play written by Alexandre Bisson, as well as an infamous 1884 portrait by artist John Singer Sargent. The video opens with Madonna singing an excerpt of a song, soon identified via Shazam as being "Extreme Occident", as it follows, "The thing that hurt the most was that I wasn't lost...I wasn't lost..."

She then elaborates that Madame X features different personas and characters:
Madame X is a secret agent. Traveling around the world. Changing identities. Fighting for freedom. Bringing light to dark places. She is a dancer. A professor. A head of state. A housekeeper. An equestrian. A prisoner. A student. A mother. A child. A teacher. A nun. A singer. A saint. A whore. A spy in the house of love. I am Madame X.

Madonna claims she was given the nomenclature "Madame X", at the age of 19, by her then dance teacher Martha Graham. According to Madonna, Graham said "I'm going to give you a new name: Madame X. Every day, you come to school and I don't recognize you. Every day, you change your identity. You're a mystery to me."

The album artwork features a close-up of the Madame X persona, with the title etched across her ruby red lips to give the illusion of her mouth being sewn shut. Mike Wass from Idolator called it an "already-iconic artwork" and compared the imagery to that of Frida Kahlo, as Madonna's name is written across her eyebrows in a manner that echoes Kahlo's unibrow. In an interview with iHeartRadio's "The Box", Madonna disclosed that she is representing her mother, Madonna Fortin, as the photo depicts what she "look[ed] like". It is used in most digital and physical formats of the album, except the digital deluxe and box set, both of which feature another photograph of blonde Madonna.

Music and lyrics 

According to AllMusic and The Daily Telegraph, the album consists of three main sounds: Latin music, trap, and art pop. According to Rich Juzwiak of Pitchfork, the album has a very diverse sound. He stated that it combines genres "as disparate as Portuguese fado, Brazilian baile funk, Cape Verdean batuque, and good old American trap to make a literal, at times clinical, rendering of world music." CJ Thorpe-Tracey of The Quietus deemed the record a "swirling fusion of trap, fado, dub, and disco", while Craig Mathieson of The Sydney Morning Herald classified it under the electronic pop genre. Madame X is Madonna's most linguistically diverse album, sung in English, Spanish, and Portuguese. When dissecting the purpose of this album, she explained that it's a love letter to multiculturalism. "Art belongs to everyone. It's not a question of appropriating what other people do and taking it as your own. For me, it's an homage to all the music that I've listened to – and giving a platform and a voice to all of this incredible music that the rest of the world doesn't really have the privilege to hear."

The album opens with "Medellín", a Latin pop duet with Colombian reggaeton singer Maluma that depicts the pair longing for a trip to the song's titular Colombian city while reflecting on their past struggles. Madonna revealed after Madame X was released that she decided to collaborate with Maluma after she realized that he loves horses, as she does. The following track, "Dark Ballet", is an experimental pop song, featuring heavy use of Daft Punk-like vocoder and orchestral music, structured similarly to that of "Bohemian Rhapsody". Additionally, the song features a sample of "The Nutcracker Suite: Dance of the Reed-Flutes" by Pyotr Ilyich Tchaikovsky. In an interview, Madonna revealed that the concept behind the song was influenced by one of her favorite films, A Clockwork Orange. She also revealed in the album's press release announcement that it was based on Joan of Arc's life. In Madonna's own words, "Joan of Arc fought the English and she won, still the French were not happy. Still they judged her. They said she was a man, they said she was a lesbian, they said she was a witch, and, in the end, they burned her at the stake, and she feared nothing. I admire that."

"God Control" is an experimental disco song that blends a gospel choir, gunshots and vocodered vocals. While describing the inspiration behind the song, Madonna stated that she wanted to incorporate elements of disco music from the late '70s, as it reminded her of when she first moved to New York City and would frequently hang out at Studio 54 – a place where she felt liberated. It talks about standing up against authoritarianism and America's gun-control laws. Madonna further recounted the song's theme as how "Nowhere is safe any more – places where we used to go to dance and escape and have fun... or pray, or go to school... No public gathering is safe. I was thinking about Studio 54, because I caught the end of that wave – I moved to New York in 1979 that was the last year that Studio 54 was sort of in existence before [co-founders] Ian [Schrager] and Steve [Rubel] got arrested. And so, just the idea that those kinds of places, that used to bring people together, are no longer safe, is a really scary thought to me. And sad. People feel like gods when they have guns in their hands." Controversy arose in November 2019 when Casey Spooner alleged that he wrote "God Control" with Mirwais and was subsequently not credited nor paid for his work.

The fourth track, "Future", is a dancehall song featuring American rapper Quavo. Lyrically, it discusses how one's viewpoint regarding the poor and underprivileged affects us on the long run. "Batuka" is heavily inspired by the music of Cape Verde, specifically Batuque. It features background vocals by The Batukadeiras Orchestra, a collective of all-female drummers, and its narrative is about commencing a revolution in an effort to defeat oppression. The sixth track, "Killers Who Are Partying", is heavily inspired by fado and it features a Portuguese guitar accompanied by a minimal beat. According to Madonna, this was the first track she wrote for the record. While elaborating its topic, Madonna specified that it's about her carrying the burden of all marginalized people. She further elucidated that "we have all these powerful men positioned in places all around the world who are celebrating and abusing their power while minorities are suffering, being degraded. The civil rights that we fought for the LGBTQ community, women's rights, everything started to go backwards and I felt that it was really important to reflect my rage, my sense of betrayal." Madonna also sings a few verses in Portuguese.

"Crave", is a midtempo pop and trap ballad featuring acoustic guitar, hand-clap beat, and guest vocals by American rapper and singer Swae Lee. Madonna stated in an interview backstage at the 2019 Billboard Music Awards that it was one of the first songs she wrote for the album and that she wanted to sing with a man on the track. On working with Swae Lee, Madonna said: "He's really talented...I think he's a great writer, a great singer and he's so cute. Cute's important." It paints the pair singing about an unreciprocated lover. The eighth track, "Crazy", is a soul-inflected track featuring a Portuguese accordion. Lyrically, it portrays Madonna as a woman madly in love who refuses to get consumed by her feelings. This is the second song on the record to feature verses sung in Portuguese. "Come Alive" pays homage to the music of North Africa, specifically that of the Gnawa tribe. In the track, Madonna further unfolded that "there's an interesting story [about] the shackles that the slaves wore so they couldn't escape. Once they were free, they turned what enslaved them into music – and they made those krakebs. I wanted to bring that instrument back into the story." The tenth track, "Extreme Occident", features elements of morna and Indian music. Madonna is once more heard singing a few lines in Portuguese. Its subject matter centres around Madonna's travels around the world searching for her own identity.

"Faz Gostoso", is a cover of the Brazilian-born Portuguese singer Blaya's signature hit. It features guest vocals by Brazilian singer Anitta and it remains faithful to the original version's baile funk style. Madonna felt it was pivotal to pay tribute to her Brazilian fans by singing in Brazilian Portuguese. According to the singer, it felt very different than Portugal's Portuguese, so she had to relearn the language. Lyrically, it's about engaging in an extramarital affair. The twelfth track, "Bitch I'm Loca", is a reggaeton song, and the second duet on the record with Maluma. It features Madonna singing most of her verses in Spanish. "I Don't Search I Find", is a house-inflected EDM and deep house, track that heavily draws influence from Madonna's own work with Shep Pettibone, namely "Vogue". The fourteenth track, "Looking for Mercy", displays Madonna at her most autobiographical – in which she admits to feeling isolated. "I Rise", described as a "powerful and uplifting anthem", deconstructs surviving and rising up from the adversities from the modern world. It contains a spoken intro taken from the speech of social activist, advocate for gun control Emma González, survivor from the Stoneman Douglas High School shooting and co-founder of committee Never Again MSD, during an interview in February 2018.

The bonus disc of the deluxe 2-CD release and the box set edition of the album feature 3 additional songs: "Funana", "Back That Up to the Beat", and "Ciao Bella". In "Funana", an electropop track, she sings about idealizing a scenario of union and while name-dropping several musical icons, such as Elvis Presley, Bob Marley, Whitney Houston, James Brown, Aretha Franklin, George Michael, David Bowie, Tupac Shakur, Freddie Mercury and Prince. In addition to these, she mentions Swedish DJ and former collaborator Avicii and Mac Miller. "Back That Up to the Beat" is a reworked version of a leaked demo from Madonna's previous album Rebel Heart. "Ciao Bella" features uncredited vocals from Bissau-Guinean musician Kimi Djabaté.

Release and promotion 

Interscope Records released Madame X on June 14, 2019. A 23-minute documentary titled World of Madame X was released on June 29 on paid streaming service Amazon Prime. Directed by Nuno Xico, the short film breaks down the album production and the inspiration behind the music, as well as featuring sneak peaks of album photoshoot and behind the scenes of music videos. An exclusive Madame X Radio channel was launched on Sirius XM Satellite Radio on July 1. It showcased music spanning her career, especially Madame X songs and the background stories behind them. On March 24, 2020, Madonna announced via her Instagram page and her Twitter account that she would release her third fragrance, subsequent to Truth or Dare, called Madame X Eau De Parfum. The perfume was announced on Twitter and released on her official store on October 13, 2020, described as a limited edition fragrance, "made up of fresh and floral scents from the Mediterranean coast, mystical flavours of the Orient, all transcended by Madame X's sensuality and rebellious spirit."  The flavours include: orange blossom, raspberry, rose, patchouli, musk and amber.

With the release of Madame X, Madonna completed her three-album contract with Interscope. In 2021, Madonna announced her return to her original record label Warner Music Group. Under the new career-spanning deal, Madame X and her other two Interscope albums will be transferred to Warner's catalog in 2025.

Singles 

The album's lead single, "Medellín", was released on April 17, 2019, coinciding with the album becoming available to pre-order. The music video premiered on April 24, during a live MTV special broadcast simultaneously around the world. It aired across numerous MTV networks and digital channels. Spanish director Diana Kunst and multi-disciplinary artist Mau Morgó, directed the video. "Medellín" reached the top-ten of the charts in several countries, including Colombia, Croatia, Hungary, Israel, and Venezuela. In the United States, the song charted at number 18 on the Hot Latin Songs and number 1 on the Hot Dance Club Songs.

"Crave" was released as the second single on May 10. It officially impacted Hot/Modern/AC radio in the United States on May 20. The music video, directed by Nuno Xico, was released two days later. The song achieved her highest debut on the US Adult Contemporary chart, launching at number 19 and reaching number 11. It was her 37th entry on the chart and her second appearance for the 2010s after "Ghosttown" in 2015 and became her best-charting AC hit since "Frozen" in 1998. The official remixes for "Crave" were released 26 October 2019.

"I Rise" was first released as a promotional single on May 3, 2019. Madonna partnered with Time Studios to create the music video for "I Rise", released on June 19, 2019. It was directed by Peter Matkiwsky and includes footage of Parkland shooting survivors, LGBTQ supporters, women's rights protesters, Olympic gymnast Aly Raisman's testimony about sexual abuse and other social justice movements. The song's remixes, produced by Tracy Young, were commercially released on July 19, 2019, as part of Worldpride 2019. This remix won a Grammy award for Best Remixed Recording at the 62nd annual ceremony. The song peaked at number 1 on the US Dance Club Songs chart, becoming Madonna's 65th entry on the chart. It also reached number 37 on the US Dance/Mix Show Airplay chart.

"I Don't Search I Find" was released as the fourth single to Italian radio stations on May 22, 2020. Two remixes EPs were released featuring remixes from Honey Dijon, Chris Cox, Offer Nissim and other producers on December 6, 2019, and May 1, 2020.

Promotional singles and music videos 

In the lead up to the full release of Madame X, "Future" and "Dark Ballet" were released as promotional singles on May 17 and June 7, respectively. The music video of "Dark Ballet" stars a Joan of Arc-inspired story-line featuring Mykki Blanco, where several heads of the church arrest and execute him. Within the video, Blanco is shown to be interpretative dancing in the iconic conical bra. The Honey Dijon remix of "I Don't Search I Find" was released on download and streaming services as of December 6, 2019. On February 14, 2020, the song became Madonna's record-breaking 50th number 1 on the Hot Dance Club Songs, the first artist to achieve this on any chart as well as in the span of 5 decades.

A music video for "God Control" was released on June 26, 2019. The video was directed by Jonas Åkerlund and depicts a shooting scene in a nightclub that resembles the 2016 Orlando nightclub shooting, and contains a call to action in favor of gun control.

A music video for the track "Batuka", directed by Emmanuel Adjei (who also had directed "Dark Ballet"), premiered on July 19, 2019. The video is very simple and revolves around Madonna and the Orquestra Batukadeiras dancing and playing Batuque. Near the end of the video, they stand together in a line, holding hands, watching the sunset and waves. The video's final shot shows what appears to be ghost sailing ships fading away as a storm forms over the ocean.

The track "Faz Gostoso", featuring Anitta, peaked at number 53 on the Portuguese Singles Chart and 47 on the monthly streaming chart published by Pro-Música Brasil.

The track "Bitch I'm Loca", featuring "Maluma", was used for Madonna and Maluma's Rolling Stone photoshoot and interview. A video containing the ItsMiggs Remix and the behind-the-scenes recording of the shoot was uploaded both onto Madonna's Instagram and YouTube channel.

Other singles 
In 2022, the demo version of "Back That Up to the Beat", from Rebel Hearts recording sessions began gaining popularity on video sharing app TikTok, leading to Madonna releasing the track on digital music platforms on December 30, alongside a sped-up version of the demo.

Live performances 
Madonna and Maluma performed "Medellín" together at the 2019 Billboard Music Awards on May 1, 2019. Madonna appeared as an interval act during the final of the Eurovision Song Contest 2019 in Tel Aviv, Israel, on May 18, 2019. She performed "Like a Prayer", a portion of "Dark Ballet", and "Future", accompanied by Quavo as a guest performer.

On June 30, Madonna included "God Control" and "I Rise" during her mini concert for Stonewall 50 – WorldPride NYC 2019 at Pier 97, Hudson River Park, New York City. On May 6, 2019, the Madame X Tour was officially announced, with concerts in theatres between September 2019 and March 2020.

On 8 October, alongside the release of the film Madame X on streaming platforms, Madonna performed a surprise concert at the Red Rooster in Harlem. She performed a stripped version of "Dark Ballet", "Crazy", "Sodade", "La Isla Bonita", and then proceeded to sing "Like A Prayer" down the streets of the city in the night.

On 24 June 2021, Madonna hosted a live performance and club event in New York, titled "Boom x Pride", at the top of The Standard, High Line, in honor of Pride Month, where she performed both "Hung Up" and "I Don't Search I Find". As part of the event, she auctioned three polaroids with the proceeds going to The Ali Forney Center, Haus of Us and The Door, which are three New York based organisations dedicated to created safe spaces for LGBTQIA+ youth. Additionally, Madonna recorded a Pride-themed video entitled No fear, Courage, Resist, which was being shown in Times Square to encourage donations to the three charities.

Critical reception 

Madame X was met with generally positive reviews. At Metacritic, which assigns a normalized rating out of 100 to reviews from mainstream publications, the album received an average score of 70, based on 21 reviews. Aggregator AnyDecentMusic? gave the album 6.9 out of 10, based on their assessment of the critical consensus.

The more positive reviews of the album generally praised its unique and experimental nature. Kitty Empire of The Guardian hailed it as being a "splendidly bizarre return to form" for Madonna, describing the production as "fluid... but one tempered by Madonna's solid confidence in her own aesthetic decisions". Similarly, Nick Smith of musicOMH  praised the album, calling it "bold, bizarre, brazen and beguiling". In his "Consumer Guide" column, Robert Christgau viewed Madame X as an indication that Madonna remains a "colorful" professional who releases solid records, even the songs "about forswearing dope and feeling the oppressed … well-intended ideas executed with the appropriate brio and calm, respectively".

However, mixed reviews of the album criticized its production aspects, as well as the nature of the singer's artistic direction. Neil McCormick of The Daily Telegraph summarized Madame X as being "a mad mishmash of an album" and criticized its lack of cohesiveness, stating that Madonna was "fighting on too many fronts at the same time". Similarly, Rob Sheffield of Rolling Stone  described the album as being "admirably bizarre", remarking that its "strongest songs" were buried beneath "disasters". In a more critical review, Rich Juzwiak from Pitchfork denounced the album as being "muddled and convoluted", calling it "lyrically inarticulate".

Accolades 

Various publications listed Madame X in their year-end lists of the best 2019 albums, including winning a poll hosted by Billboard.

The documentary World of Madame X won at the "Best Documentary" category during the Buenos Aires Music Video Festival (BAMV Fest) in 2020.

Commercial performance 
Madame X debuted at number one on the US Billboard 200 with 95,000 album-equivalent units, of which 90,000 were pure album sales. It became Madonna's ninth number-one album in the United States. Madonna also topped the Billboard Artist 100 chart for the first time since its launch in 2014. Due to lack of sales and streaming, the album fell to number 77 on the next week's Billboard 200, and  dropped out of that chart on its third week (the shortest American performance for a Madonna studio album), but it remained for nine weeks on the Top Album Sales chart. In February 2022, almost three years after its release, the album was certified Silver in the UK. In France, it started at number four on the album chart with 15,900 traditional units. It also entered the Sales Albums Chart at number five. In Germany, Madame X became Madonna's lowest charting studio album since 1992's Erotica, peaking at number five.

Track listing 

Notes
  signifies a co-producer
  The 15-track deluxe edition was released on digital platforms and as an exclusive CD on Target and Fnac and HMV.
  The deluxe box set edition includes the deluxe 2-CD edition, the 7" vinyl single, and the 13-track cassette.
  On the 2-CD of Madame X, "Future" has Quavo and "Crave" has Swae Lee credited as an featured artists instead of a co-lead ones respectively.
 "Dark Ballet" contains a sample of "The Nutcracker Suite: Dance of the Reed-Flutes", composed by Pyotr Ilyich Tchaikovsky.
 "Faz Gostoso" is a cover of the song of the same name, originally performed by Blaya.
 "Ciao Bella" features vocals by Kimi Djabate.
 “Madame X” (International Deluxe) was made available to stream on all platforms on 13 January 2023.

Personnel 

 Madonna – main vocals
 Anitta – featured artist
 The Batukadeiras Orchestra – background vocals
 Swae Lee – featured artist
 Maluma – featured artist
 Quavo – featured artist
 Tiffin Children's Choir – background vocals
 Steven Klein – photography

Charts

Weekly charts

Year-end charts

Certifications and sales

See also 
 List of Billboard 200 number-one albums of 2019
 List of number-one albums of 2019 (Portugal)
 List of number-one digital albums of 2019 (Australia)

References

External links 
 Madame X on Madonna.com
 

2019 albums
Madame X (Madonna)
Albums produced by Diplo
Albums produced by Jason Evigan
Albums produced by Jeff Bhasker
Albums produced by Madonna
Albums produced by Mike Dean (record producer)
Albums produced by Pharrell Williams
Art pop albums
Interscope Records albums
Latin music albums by American artists
Madonna albums
Trap music albums
Experimental music albums
World music albums by American artists